The 2020 Puerto Rican general elections was held on November 3, 2020 to elect the officials of the Puerto Rican government who will serve from January 2021 to January 2025, most notably the position of Governor and Resident Commissioner. In addition, there was also a non-binding status referendum to ask voters if Puerto Rico should become the 51st state of the Union.

Pedro Pierluisi and Jenniffer González won the Governor and Resident Commissioner race, respectively. Pierluisi was elected Governor of Puerto Rico with the lowest percentage of votes ever for a winner. The Yes option won the status referendum, making it the third time the option of Statehood won.

Final candidates

Governor 

The nominees for the position of Governor of Puerto Rico are:

 Pedro Pierluisi Urrutia, New Progressive Party (PNP/D)
 Carlos Delgado Altieri, Popular Democratic Party (PPD/I)
 Juan Dalmau Ramírez, Puerto Rican Independence Party (PIP)
 Alexandra Lúgaro Aponte, Citizen's Victory Movement (MVC)
 César Vázquez Muñiz, Project Dignity (PD)
 Eliezer Molina Pérez, Independent candidate

Resident Commissioner 

The nominees for the position of Resident Commissioner of Puerto Rico are (bold denotes incumbent candidate):

 Jenniffer González Colón, New Progressive Party (PNP/R)
 Aníbal Acevedo Vilá, Popular Democratic Party (PPD/D)
 Luis Roberto Piñero, Puerto Rican Independence Party (PIP)
 Zayira Jordán Conde, Citizen's Victory Movement (MVC)
 Ada Norah Henriquez, Project Dignity (PD)

Senate

At-large 

The ballot features candidates from five different parties and one independent candidate (bold denotes incumbent candidates).

New Progressive Party (PNP) 
 William Villafañe
 Gregorio Matías Rosario
 Keren Riquelme
 Itzamar Peña Ramírez
 Thomas Rivera Schatz
 Carlos Rodríguez Mateo

Popular Democratic Party (PPD)
 José Luis Dalmau Santiago 
 Aníbal José Torres
 Brenda López de Arrarás
 Luis Vega Ramos
 Juan Zaragoza Gómez
 Ada Álvarez Conde

Other parties
 María de Lourdes Santiago (PIP)
 Rafael Bernabe Riefkohl (MVC)
 Ana Irma Rivera Lassén (MVC)
 Joanne Rodríguez-Veve (PD)
 José Antonio Vargas Vidot (Independent)

District

San Juan
 Henry Neumann (PNP)
 Nitza Morán (PNP)
 Jesús Manuel Laboy (PPD)
 Claribel Martínez Marmolejos (PPD)
 Adriana Guitiérrez Colón (PIP)
 Andrés González Berdecia (PIP)
 Rosa Seguí Cordero (MVC)
 Marilú Guzmán (MVC)

Bayamón
 Carmelo Rios (PNP)
 Migdalia Padilla Alvelo (PNP)
 Magdiel Colon (PPD)
 Carlos Roberto Hyland (PPD)
 Yelitza Lucena Quiles (PIP)
 Hugo Rodríguez Díaz (PIP)
 Myrna Conty (MVC)
 Ruthie Arroyo (MVC)

Arecibo
 José Pérez Rosa (PNP)
 Ángel Martínez (PNP)
 Rubén Soto Rivera (PPD)
 Elizabeth Rosa Vélez (PPD)
 Luis Romero Nieves (PIP)
 Roberto Rivera Olivencia (PIP)
 Yamira Colón Rosa (MVC)
 Annette Jiménez Collet (MVC)
 Arnaldo López Rosado (PD)

Mayagüez-Aguadilla
 Luis Daniel Muñiz (PNP)
  Marcos Gonzalez (PNP)
 Ada Garciá Montes (PPD)
 Migdalia González (PPD)
 Juan Mari Pesquera (PIP)
 Luis Casiano Rodríguez (PIP)
 Luis Ferren (MVC)
 Marisol Vega (MVC)

Ponce
 Luis Berdiel (PNP)
 Nelson Cruz (PNP)
 Marially Gonzáles (PPD)
 Ramón Ruiz (PPD)
 José Ortiz Lugo (PIP)
 Ángel Comas Nazario (PIP)
 Daniel Ortíz (MVC)
 Maikel González (MVC)
 Luis Yordár Frau (PD)
 Elaine Arrufat Berastain (PD)

Guayama
 Wanda Cruz (PNP)
 Alex Roque (PNP)
 Gretchen Hau (PPD)
 Albert Torres Berrios (PPD)
 Víctor Alvarado Guzmán (PIP)
 Justo Echevarriá Figueroa (PIP)
 Tomas Flores Torres (MVC)

Humacao
 Wanda Soto (PNP)
 Miguel Laureano (PNP)
 Rosamar Trujillo Plumey (PPD)
 Hill Román Abreu (PPD)
 Juan Lebrón López (PIP)
 Edda López Serrano (PIP)
 Xander Torres (MVC)
 Mayra Vicil Bernier (MVC)

Carolina
 Marissa Jiménez (PNP)
 Nayda Venegas Brown (PNP)
 Javier Aponte Dalmau (PPD)
 Christian Rodríguez (PPD)
 Wanda Alemán Alemán (PIP)
 Marisol Quiñones Algarín (PIP)
 Alice Pérez Fernandez (MVC)
 Reginald Smith Pizarro (MVC)
 Janise Santiago Ramos (PD)

House of Representatives

At-large 

The ballot features candidates from five different parties (bold denotes incumbent candidates). 

New Progressive Party (PNP)
 José Torres Zamora
 José "Quiquito" Meléndez
 José Aponte Hernández
 Lourdes Ramos
 Néstor Alonso Vega
 Jorge Emmanuel Báez Pagán

Popular Democratic Party (PPD)
 Héctor Ferrer Santiago
 Jesús Manuel Ortiz González
 Keyliz Méndez Torres
 Yaramary Torres
 Gabriel López Arrieta
 Enid Monge

Other parties
 Denis Márquez Lebrón (PIP)
 José Bernando Márquez (MVC)
 Mariana Nogales Molinelli (MVC)
 Lisie J. Burgos Muñiz (PD)

District 
The ballot features candidates from five different parties and several independent candidates (bold denotes incumbent candidates).

 Representative District 1
 Eddie Charbonnier Chinea (PNP)
 Rosario Tata (PPD)
 Carmen Santiago Negrón (PIP)
 Alberto Derkes de León (MVC)

 Representative District 2
 Ricardo Rey Ocasio (PNP)
 Luis Torres Cruz (PPD)
 Dario Ortiz González (PIP)
 Fernando Villaespesa (MVC)
 Julio Vargas Cruz (Independent)

 Representative District 3

 Juan Morales Rodríguez (PNP)
 José Ortiz (PPD)
 Ángel Alicea Montañez (PIP)
 Eva Prados Rodríguez (MVC)

 Representative District 4
 Victor Parés (PNP)
 Manuel Calderón Cerame(PPD)
 Marian Ortiz Vargaz (PIP)
 Rafaela Esteves Agramonte (MVC)

Representative District 5
 Jorge Navarro (PNP)
 Roberto Zayas (PPD)
 Alfonzo Questell Ortiz (PIP)
 Carlos Ávila Pacheco (MVC)
 Ricardo Rodríguez Quiles (PD)

Representative District 6
 Antonio Soto (PNP)
 Noemí Andújar (PPD)
 Jaime Rodríguez Rivera (PIP)
 Alex Rodríguez Rodríguez (MVC)

Representative District 7
 Luis Pérez Ortiz (PNP)
 Janice Nieves (PPD)
 Mario Maldonado Ramírez (PIP)
 Carmen Pagán Cabrera (MVC)

Representative District 8
 Yashira Lebrón Rodríguez (PNP)
 Eric Bonilla Latoni (PPD)
 Jesús Dávila Molina (PIP)
 Moraima Rodríguez (MVC)
 Paul Rodríguez González (PD)

Representative District 9
 Yazzer Morales Díaz (PNP)
 Noelia Ramos Vázquez (PPD)
 Iván Sánchez Almodovar (PIP)
 Edna Vázquez Díaz (MVC)

Representative District 10
 Pedro Santiago Guzman (PNP)
 Deborah Soto Arroyo (PPD)
 Roberto Jusino Serrano (PIP)

Representative District 11
 Isabela Molina (PNP)
 Rafael Hernandez (PPD)
 Guillermo Martínez Rivera (PIP)

Representative District 12
 Javier Parés (PNP)
 Edgardo Feliciano (PPD)
 Ángel Santana (PIP)
 Edwin Marrero Santiago (MVC)

Representative District 13
 Gabriel Rodríguez Aguiló (PNP)
 Brian Casais García (PPD)
 Yahaira Velázquez Correa (PIP)
 José Cintron (MVC)

Representative District 14
 José González (PNP)
 Juan Torres (PPD)
 Héctor Guillermo Díaz (PIP)
 Ismael Rodríguez Medina (MVC)

Representative District 15
 Joel Franqui Atiles (PNP)
 Armando Legarreta Raíces (PPD)
 Fernando Babilonia (PIP)

Representative District 16
 Félix Lassale Toro (PNP)
 Eladio Cordonia (PPD)
 Pedro Méndez Acosta (PIP)

Representative District 17
 Wilson Roman (PNP)
 David Villanueva (PPD)
 Hector Santaella Buitrago (PIP)
 Santiago Concepción Cajigas (MVC)

Representative District 18
 Jose Pérez Cordero (PNP)
 Jessi Cortés Ramos (PPD)
 Antonio Vargas Morales (PIP)
 Pedro Acevedo Vargas (MVC)

Representative District 19
 Maricarmen Mas Rodríguez (PNP)
 Jocelyne Rodríguez Negrón (PPD)
 Jose Muñiz Quiñones (PIP)
 Yadira Vázquez Rivera (MVC)

Representative District 20
 Emilio Carlo (PNP)
 Kebin Maldonado Martinez (PPD)
 Milagros Martínez Pérez (PIP)
 Noé Ramírez Ramírez (MVC)

 Representative District 21
 Yamilet González Alicea (PNP)
 Lydia Méndez (PPD)
 Jaime Camacho Román (PIP)
 Andrés Acosta Mercado (MVC)

Representative District 22
 Michael Quiñones (PNP)
 Jorge Alfredo (PPD)
 Edna Quiñones (PIP)

Representative District 23
 Victor Torres (PNP)
 José Rivera Madera (PPD)
 Jimmy Borrero (PIP)
 Saime Figueroa Rodríguez (MVC)

Representative District 24
 José Banchs Alemán (PNP)
 Ángel Fourquet (PPD)
 Carlos Reyes Alonso (PIP)
 Reinaldo Colón Vega (MVC)
 Luis Salinas (PD)

Representative District 25
 Jacqueline Rodríguez (PNP)
 Domingo Torres Garcia (PPD)
 Gerardo Cruz López (PIP)
 José Hernández Pagán (PD)

Representative District 26
 Urayoán Hernández Alvarado (PNP)
 Orlando Aponte Rosario (PPD)
 Calixto Negrón Aponte (PIP)

Representative District 27
 Manuel Claudio Rodríguez (PNP)
 Estrella Martínez Soto (PPD)
 Rafael Rosario Rivera (PIP)

Representative District 28
 Rafael June Rivera (PNP)
 Juan Santiago Nievez (PPD)
 Roy Ayala Pérez (PIP)
 José Daniel Rodríguez (MVC)

Representative District 29
 Lisandro Morales Vázquez (PNP)
 José Díaz Collazo (PPD)
 Fernando Maldonado Morales (PIP)

Representative District 30
 Héctor Torres (PNP)
 Luis Ortiz Lugo (PPD)
 Eduardo Soto (PIP)

Representative District 31
 Vimarie Peña Dávila (PNP)
 Jesús Santa Rodríguez (PPD)
 Luis Domenech Sepúlveda (PIP)
 César García Martinez (MVC)
 Raúl Colón Rodríguez (PD)

Representative District 32
 José Mercado (PNP)
 José Varela (PPD)
 Jesús Roque (PIP)
 Maritza Maymí Hernández (MVC)

Representative District 33
 Ángel Peña Jr. (PNP)
 Luis Collazo Negrón (PPD)
 Gloria Santana Velázquez (PIP)

Representative District 34
 Félix Figueroa (PNP)
 Ramón Cruz Burgos (PPD)
 Carlos Rosado Dávila (PIP)

Representative District 35
 Alejandro Martínez Burgos (PNP)
 Sol Higgins (PPD)
 Ricardo Díaz Maldonado (PIP)
 Samuel Pagán Cuadrado (Independent)

Representative District 36
 Carlos Méndez (PNP)
 Juan Gómez (PPD)
 Carlos Rosado Dávila (PIP)

Representative District 37
 Ángel Bulerín (PNP)
 Ángel Osorio Vélez (PPD)
 Reginald Carrasquillo (PIP)
 Eilleen Ramos Rivera (PD)

Representative District 38
 Wanda del Valle Correa (PNP)
 Luis Rivera Filomino (PPD)
 Luz Álvarez Rodríguez (PIP)
 Daniel Lugo Mercado (MVC)
 Emmanuel Huertas (Independent)

Representative District 39
 Luis Alberto Cortés (PNP)
 Roberto Rivera Ruiz de Porras (PPD)
 Luis Cruz Batista (PIP)
 Manuel Alonso López (MVC)

Representative District 40
 Sergio Estevez (PNP)
 Ángel Matos Garcia (PPD)
 María Vargas Cáceres (PIP)
 Tiffany Rohena (MVC)

Referendum 

This referendum asked one yes-or-no question: "¿Debe Puerto Rico ser admitido inmediatamente dentro de la Unión como un Estado?" (Should Puerto Rico be admitted immediately into the Union as a State?)

There were 655,505 votes in favor of statehood (52.52%) and 592,671 votes opposed (47.48%).
The referendum was non-binding, as the power to grant statehood lies with the United States Congress.

Polling

Governorship

Resident Commissioner

San Juan Mayoralty

Referendum

Results

Governorship 

The gubernatorial election was won by Former Resident Commissioner Pedro Pierluisi (PNP/D), narrowly defeating Isabela Mayor Carlos Delgado (PPD/I). The margin of victory was of 1.49%, making it the third closest election in the last 20 years, the former being the 2004 election (0.18%) and the 2012 election (0.7%). In a surprising turn of events, all five parties remained registered, including the Puerto Rican Independence Party (PIP) which had failed to remain registered in the last 4 elections.

Resident Commissioner 

The Resident Commissioner election was won by Incumbent Resident Commissioner Jennifer Gonzalez (PNP/R), defeating Former Governor Anibal Acevedo Vila (PPD/D) by a wide margin (9.02%). Gonzalez received the most votes out of any candidate. She will become the first female and youngest resident commissioner to be re-elected to her seat.

Senate 

|- style="background-color:#E9E9E9"
! rowspan="2" colspan="2" style="text-align:center;" | Parties
! style="text-align:center;" colspan="3" | District
! style="text-align:center;" colspan="3" | At-large
! rowspan="2" style="text-align:center;" colspan="1" | Total seats
! rowspan="2" style="text-align:center;" colspan="1" | Composition
! rowspan="2" style="text-align:center;" colspan="1" | ±%
|- style="background-color:#E9E9E9"
! style="text-align:center;" | Votes
! style="text-align:center;" | %
! style="text-align:center;" | Seats
! style="text-align:center;" | Votes
! style="text-align:center;" | %
! style="text-align:center;" | Seats
|- style="text-align:right;"
| bgcolor=#cc0033|
| style="text-align:left;" | Popular Democratic Party (PPD)
| 836,889
| 36.61%
| 10
| 378,738
| 31.26%
| 2
| 12
| 
| 5
|- style="text-align:right;"
| bgcolor=#0000cc width=3 |
| style="text-align:left;" | New Progressive Party (PNP)
| 859,719
| 37.62%
| 6
| 383,766
| 33.07%
| 4
| 10
| 
| class="nowrap"|11
|- style="text-align:right;"
| bgcolor=#CFB53B |
| style="text-align:left;" | Citizen's Victory Movement (MVC)
| 324,319
| 14.19%
| 0
| 130,065
| 11.20%
| 2
| 2
| 
| 2
|- style="text-align:right;"
| bgcolor=#33cc66 |
| style="text-align:left;" | Puerto Rican Independence Party (PIP)
| 205,137
| 8.98%
| 0
| 136,679
| 11.29%
| 1
| 1
| 
| 1
|- style="text-align:right;"
| bgcolor=#00B7EB |
| style="text-align:left;" | Project Dignity (PD)
| 59,189
| 2.59%
| 0
| 88,716
| 7.33%
| 1
| 1
| 
| 1
|- style="text-align:right;"
| bgcolor=#DDDDDD |
| style="text-align:left;" | Independent
| 0
| 0%
| 0
| 69,810
| 5.76%
| 1
| 1
| 
| 1
|- style="background-color=#0000cc;text-align:right;"
|-
|align=left colspan=2|Total
| 2,285,253
| 100.0
| 16
| 1,211,126
| 100.0
| 11
| 27
|
|
|}
While the New Progressive Party lost their 2/3 majority, the Popular Democratic Party failed to get the 1/2 majority by two seats. This senate will be the most diverse, having at least one senator of each party, including one independent senator.

House of Representatives 

|- style="background-color:#E9E9E9"
! rowspan="2" colspan="2" style="text-align:center;" | Parties
! style="text-align:center;" colspan="3" | District
! style="text-align:center;" colspan="3" | At-large
! rowspan="2" style="text-align:center;" colspan="1" | Total seats
! rowspan="2" style="text-align:center;" colspan="1" | Composition
! rowspan="2" style="text-align:center;" colspan="1" | ±%
|- style="background-color:#E9E9E9"
! style="text-align:center;" | Votes
! style="text-align:center;" | %
! style="text-align:center;" | Seats
! style="text-align:center;" | Votes
! style="text-align:center;" | %
! style="text-align:center;" | Seats
|- style="text-align:right;"
| bgcolor=#cc0033|
| style="text-align:left;" | Popular Democratic Party (PPD)
| 460,207
| 39.13%
| 24
| 435,325
| 36.03%
| 2
| 26
| 
| class="nowrap"| 10
|- style="text-align:right;"
| bgcolor=#0000cc width=3 |
| style="text-align:left;" | New Progressive Party (PNP)
| 460,484
| 39.16%
| 16
| 408,869
| 33.84%
| 5
| 21
| 
| 13
|- style="text-align:right;"
| bgcolor=#CFB53B |
| style="text-align:left;" | Citizen's Victory Movement (MVC)
| 130,993
| 11.14%
| 0
| 154,971
| 12.83%
| 2
| 2
| 
| 2
|- style="text-align:right;"
| bgcolor=#33cc66 |
| style="text-align:left;" | Puerto Rican Independence Party (PIP)
| 102,266
| 8.70%
| 0
| 127,577
| 10.56%
| 1
| 1
| 
| 1
|- style="text-align:right;"
| bgcolor=#00B7EB |
| style="text-align:left;" | Project Dignity (PD)
| 18,790
| 1.60%
| 0
| 81,360
| 6.73%
| 1
| 1
| 
| 1
|- style="text-align:right;"
| bgcolor=#DDDDDD |
| style="text-align:left;" | Independent
| 3,277
| 0.28%
| 0
| 0
| 0%
| 0
| 0
| 
| 0
|- style="background-color=#0000cc;text-align:right;"
|-
|align=left colspan=2|Total
| 1,176,017
| 100.0
| 40
| 1,208,102
| 100.0
| 11
| 51
|
|
|}

The New Progressive Party lost their 2/3 majority and the Popular Democratic Party gained enough seats to receive the 1/2 majority. This House of Representatives will be the most diverse, having at least one representative of each party.

Mayoral 

The Popular Democratic Party kept the majority of municipalities, but it lowered from 45 to 41. Many incumbent mayors lost their races after years in the position, like Ponce (12 years under PNP) and Humacao (20 years under PPD). The closest race was of Guánica, where both Ismael Rodríguez (PPD) and Edgardo Cruz (Ind) claimed victory. At the end, the Supreme Court confirmed Rodríguez as the winner.

Referendum 

The option of Yes won in the referendum, making the third time Statehood wins the majority of votes. The referendum will be non-binding, as the power to grant statehood lies with the United States Congress.

Notes

References

General elections in Puerto Rico
2020 in Puerto Rico
Puerto Rico
Election and referendum articles with incomplete results
Puerto Rico elections
 
Puerto Rico